Riddell as a surname may refer to:
 Riddell baronets
 Henry Scott Riddell (1798–1870), Scottish poet and songwriter
 Archibald Riddell (minister), 17th-century Presbyterian minister in Scotland and America
 Archibald Riddell (politician) (1864–1945), Canadian farmer and politician
 Alan Riddell, labour relations lawyer
 Alastair Riddell, glam rock musician from New Zealand
 Arthur George Riddell (1836–1907), Roman Catholic Bishop of Northampton
 Campbell Drummond Riddell (1796–1858), Australian Colonial public servant
 Carol Anne Riddell, education reporter and co-anchor for WNBC-TV news
 Charlotte Riddell (1832–1906), writer of the Victorian period
 Chris Riddell (born 1962), British illustrator, cartoonist and writer of children's books
 Clay Riddell (1937-2018), Canadian billionaire, founder and CEO of Paramount Resources
 Derek Riddell (born 1967), Scottish television actor
 Don Riddell (born 1972), English news anchor and sports journalist
 Elizabeth Riddell (1910–1998), Australian poet and journalist
 Gary Riddell (1966–1989), Scottish footballer
 George Riddell, 1st Baron Riddell (1865–1934), British solicitor, newspaper proprietor
 George W. Riddell, Pinkerton labor spy
 Hannah Riddell (1855–1932), English woman founded Hansen's disease hospital in Japan
 Harriet Riddell (born 1990), British artist
 James Riddell (disambiguation), multiple people
 Jim Riddell, New Zealand rugby player
 John Riddell (disambiguation), multiple people
 Mark Riddell (born 1981), Australian rugby player
 Mike Riddell (born 1953), New Zealand  writer
 Neil Riddell (born 1947), English cricketer
 Norman Riddell (1887–1918), English footballer
 Peter Riddell, British journalist and author
 Rachel Riddell (born 1984), Canadian water polo player
 Ray Riddell (born 1919), Australian football player
 Richard Riddell, American lighting designer
 Robert Riddell (1755–1794), Laird of Friar's Carse, friend of Robert Burns
 Rosemary Riddell, New Zealand actor, film director and judge 
 Victor Riddell (1905–1976), English cricketer
 Walter Alexander Riddell (1881–1963), Canadian civil servant and diplomat
 William Riddell (1807–1847), Roman Catholic bishop
 William Glendinning Riddell (1865–1957), magistrate in New Zealand
 W. J. B. Riddell aka Brownlow Riddell (1899-1976), Scottish ophthalmologist
 William Renwick Riddell (1852–1945), Canadian lawyer, judge, and historian

Surnames of Lowland Scottish origin